Wendy Aguilar (born 14 May 1972) is a Mexican former synchronized swimmer who competed in the 1996 Summer Olympics.

References

1972 births
Living people
Mexican synchronized swimmers
Olympic synchronized swimmers of Mexico
Synchronized swimmers at the 1996 Summer Olympics
Pan American Games medalists in synchronized swimming
Pan American Games bronze medalists for Mexico
Synchronized swimmers at the 1995 Pan American Games
Medalists at the 1995 Pan American Games